Cleptometopus subolivaceus is a species of beetle in the family Cerambycidae. It was described by Breuning in 1949.

References

subolivaceus
Beetles described in 1949